Capital punishment is abolished in the U.S. State of West Virginia since 1965.

Prior to secession from the Confederacy and admission to the Union on June 20, 1863, West Virginia was a part of Virginia. 43 people were executed under Virginia's authority, 112 after statehood.

The first two people executed in the State of West Virginia were Daniel Grogan and Thomas Boice, both convicted of murder. After secession, no women have been executed in West Virginia. Hanging was an official method until 1949.

In 1949, West Virginia was the last state to adopt the electric chair as its only means of execution. The two first inmates electrocuted were Harry Burdette and Fred Painter. Then-State Delegate Robert Byrd was among the official witnesses during their executions. Byrd recalled this event, stating "It's not a beautiful thing."

Until 1959, 102 people were hanged, nine electrocuted and one hung in chains.

The last person executed by West Virginia was Elmer Bruner on April 3, 1959, for the robbery-murder of Ruby Miller committed with the claw-end of a hammer in Huntington.

No federal executions have taken place in West Virginia, but two were sentenced to death in 2007, George Lecco and Valerie Friend, for the murder of an informant who was supplying federal law enforcement with information about the Leccos cocaine drug ring. Those verdicts and sentences were overturned in 2009 due to juror misconduct, and the retrials ended with life without parole and 35 years for Lecco and Friend respectively.

Along with Iowa, West Virginia became the final pre-Furman state to abolish capital punishment in 1965.

See also
 List of people executed in West Virginia
 Crime in West Virginia

References 

 
West V
Crime in West Virginia
West Virginia law